William Holden (born July 23, 1949) is a Canadian former professional ice hockey player who played in the World Hockey Association (WHA). Holden played two games for the Toronto Toros and Winnipeg Jets during the 1973–74 WHA season.

References

External links

1949 births
Living people
Canadian ice hockey goaltenders
Ice hockey people from Toronto
Toronto Toros players
Winnipeg Jets (WHA) players